Vrh pri Hinjah is a small village in the Municipality of Žužemberk in southeastern Slovenia. The area is part of the historical region of Lower Carniola. The municipality is now included in the Southeast Slovenia Statistical Region.

Name
The name of the settlement was changed from Vrh to Vrh pri Hinjah in 1953.

Church
The local church is dedicated to Saint Thomas and belongs to the Parish of Hinje. It is a small 17th-century building with a 19th-century altar.

References

External links
Vrh pri Hinjah at Geopedia

Populated places in the Municipality of Žužemberk